Kallidin is a bioactive kinin formed in response to injury from kininogen precursors through the action of kallikreins.

Kallidin is a decapeptide whose sequence is H-Lys-Arg-Pro-Pro-Gly-Phe-Ser-Pro-Phe-Arg-OH. It can be converted to bradykinin by the aminopeptidase enzyme.

It can be a substrate for carboxypeptidase M and N.

Kallidin is identical to bradykinin with an additional lysine residue added at the N-terminal end and signals through the bradykinin receptor.

References

Peptides
Kinin–kallikrein system